Hammerfest is a music festival held annually in North Wales. From 2013, Hammerfest has moved to the Haven site in Pwllheli, Hafan y Môr Holiday Park as the festival has outgrown its original site at Pontin's Holiday Village, Prestatyn, Wales.  It is not related to a music festival of the same name hosted by white supremacist groups. The festival is owned by emc3i Ltd, sponsored by the music magazine Metal Hammer and run by the organizers of the Hard Rock Hell festival. Because the festival is held at a holiday camp, the organizers can make use of pre-built venues and stages, and attendees can stay in the on-site accommodation. This enables the festival to be held during the winter/spring months when outdoor camping is not desirable.

Hammerfest I 

The original Hammerfest was held on 24–25 April 2009 in Prestatyn. Fifty bands appeared at the festival spread over three stages and across the two days. Saxon, Sepultura and Opeth headlined the two-day event.

 Bullet For my Valentine were originally booked as headliners for the festival, but pulled out due to recording commitments.

Hammerfest II 

The second Hammerfest was held on 12–13 March 2010, with a pre-party on the preceding Thursday. 44 bands performed across three stages during the two-day festival, with an additional 8 bands performing on the second and third stages during the Thursday pre-party. The festival was headlined by 5 Finger Death Punch and Suicidal Tendencies.

Hammerfest III

The third Hammerfest was held on 18–19 March 2011. A pre-party was held on the preceding Thursday as in the previous year, with bands performing on the second and third stages. 48 bands performed across three stages during the two-day festival, with an additional 11 bands performing during the Thursday pre-party. Accept and Sabaton were the headline acts.

Four months before the festival, Pontin's (who own the venue) went into administration. However, the festival still took place as scheduled.

Hammerfest IV

Hammerfest returned for a fourth edition of the festival on 15–18 March 2012. Anthrax and Skindred were the headline acts on the main stage. The format was the same as previous years with the pre-party beginning on the Thursday night. In Total, 57 bands played across the three stages. Tickets for next year's Hammerfest 5 went on sale during the festival which promises to be bigger than ever at the new site.

Hammerfest V 

The fifth installment took place between the 14 and 16 March 2013. The pre-party night took place on the 14th with bands playing on the second stage. Hammerfest 5 saw the introduction of an unplugged stage on the Friday but in general only two stages were used. The event was moved to Hafan Y Mor in Pwllheli.

Hammerfest VI

Hammerfest VI ("Book of the Dead") was in Pwllheli from 13 March to 16 March 2014.

Hammerfest VII

Hammerfest VII, titled "METAL MARAUDERS" was held from 12 March to 15 March 2015.

References

External links

Heavy metal festivals in the United Kingdom
Music festivals in Wales
Pwllheli
Spring (season) events in Wales